J. E. B. Stuart (1833–1864) was a Confederate general in the American Civil War.

Jeb Stuart may also refer to:

Jeb Stuart (writer) (born 1956), an American filmmaker
J. E. B. Stuart High School, in Fairfax, Virginia
Jeb Stuart Jr. and Jeb Stuart III, characters in the Southern Victory series by Harry Turtledove

See also
Jeb Stuart Magruder (1934–2014), an American political operative and Watergate conspirator